The 9 by 5 Impression Exhibition was an art exhibition in Melbourne, Australia. It opened on 17 August 1889 at Buxton's Rooms on Swanston Street and featured 183 works, the majority of which were painted by Charles Conder, Tom Roberts and Arthur Streeton of the Heidelberg School art movement, also known as Australian impressionism. The exhibition's name references the dimensions of most of the paintings—, the size of the cigar box lids upon which many of the works were painted—as well as the impressionist techniques employed by the artists.

The majority of the 9 by 5s were painted over the autumn and winter of 1889, which is reflected in the tones and weather effects of many of the landscapes. The rural suburb of Heidelberg, where Streeton had established an artists' camp the previous year, is featured in many of the works. Melbourne's urban life and culture are also depicted, with landmarks such as Princess Theatre, the Old Treasury and the Burke and Wills statue making appearances, as well as the city's trams and games of Australian rules football.

The exhibition created much lively commentary at the time and is now seen as a "celebrated event in Australian art history". 9 by 5s continue to appear on the market; in 2019, Roberts' She-Oak and Sunlight sold at Sotheby's for A$770,000. In 2012, to mark the 123rd anniversary of the exhibition, arts benefactor Max Carter donated four 9 by 5s (valued at over A$3,000,000) to the Art Gallery of South Australia, the largest group of 9 by 5s ever given to an Australian public institution.

Gallery of 9 by 5s

References

External links
Exhibition catalogue, designed by Charles Conder
9 by 5 exhibition at the Heidelberg Artists Society

Heidelberg School
1889 in Australia
Art exhibitions in Australia
Paintings by Tom Roberts
Arts in Melbourne